Nanban is a 1954 Indian Tamil-language film directed by P. S. Srinivasa Rao. The film stars R. S. Manohar and P. K. Saraswathi.

Cast
List adapted from the database of Film News Anandan and from Thiraikalanjiyam.

Male cast
R. S. Manohar
T. S. Balaiah
V. Nagayya
K. A. Thangavelu

Female cast
P. K. Saraswathi
Vidhyavathi
T. D. Kusalakumari

Production
The film was produced by M. D. Viswanathan and directed by P. S. Srinivasa Rao under the banner M. D. V. Productions. M. Lakshmanan wrote the story while V. N. Sambandam penned the dialogues.

Soundtrack
Music was composed by G. Ramanathan while the lyrics were penned by Thanjai N. Ramaiah Dass. Playback singers are Ghantasala, Thiruchi Loganathan, P. A. Periyanayaki, P. Leela and Jikki.

References

1950s Tamil-language films
Films scored by G. Ramanathan